Bösel is a municipality in the district of Cloppenburg, in Lower Saxony, Germany.

History
Bösel was first mentioned in 1080 under the name Borsla (= "Forest at a wavy bank") in a testimonial of the bishop of Osnabrück.

The first written document of a chapel in Bösel is dated with the year 1574, but Bösel was not separated from its mother church in Altenoythe and made an independent commune until 1876. Today Bösel consists of nine areas (Bösel-Ort, Edewechterdamm, Glaßdorf, Hülsberg, Osterloh, Ostland, Overlahe, Petersdorf und Westerloh).

Politics
 Mayor: Hermann Block

The municipal council of Bösel consists of the following seats:
 CDU: 14 seats
 SPD: 2 seats
 FDP: 3 seats
 UWB: 2 seats

Schools
 St.-Martin-Grundschule
 Haupt- und Realschule
 Grundschule Petersdorf

Places of interest
 Museum park „Am Pallert“ which contains:
 Heimathaus (traditional house)
 Landmaschinenmuseum (Museum of agricultural engines)
 Brotbackhaus (traditional bakery)
 Bauerngarten in der Parkanlage (traditional rural garden within the park)

Economy and Infrastructure
Bösel is member of the „Zweckverband Interkommunaler Industriepark Küstenkanal“ and takes places in the industrial area c-Port.

Events
 Schuetzenfest
 Euro-Musiktage

See also
Greta Bösel (1908–1947), German concentration camp guard executed for war crimes

References

External links
 Official site ,
 German Wikipedia 

Cloppenburg (district)